City War is a 1988 Hong Kong crime action film directed by Suen Chung and starring Chow Yun-fat and Ti Lung in their third collaboration after A Better Tomorrow 1 and 2.

Plot
This Hong Kong crime thriller stars Chow Yun-Fat and Ti Lung as two cops who must hunt down Chu, a crime boss who has just been released from prison and is out for revenge against the mismatched partners. Dick Lee (Chow Yun-fat) and Ken Chow (Ti Lung) are two police officers and are friends. Dick Lee is a negotiator who is a humorous and easy going. Ken Chow is a hot tempered cop who hates evil as his enemy and advocates violence for violence. Drug lord Ted Yiu, who was imprisoned by Ken two years ago, was released from prison and Ken's former partner Ho Ka Ting is mysteriously killed. Later, Ted also laid traps to trick Ken, which cause his disciplinary punishment by the police and later sends killers to threaten Ken's life and kill his family. On the other hand, Dick incidentally meets Penny, who is Ted's lover. A tangled conflict later brakes off in the city.

Cast
This is a list of cast.
Chow Yun-fat as Dick Lee
Ti Lung as Ken Chow
Tien Niu as Penny
Norman Chui as Ted Yiu
Mary Hon as Fan
Teresa Carpio as Teresa
Lo Lieh as Boss Kuen
Lee Ka-ting as Assistant Chief Officer Ho Ka-ting
Michael Chow as Bobby
Ricky Wong as Sergeant Wu
Law Ching-ho as bartender
Chan Chi-fai as Ted's thug
Robin Shou as Ted's hired killer
John Ladalski as arms smuggler
Eddie Maher as arms smuggler's assistant
Ng Hong-sang as man who gives guns to Dick Lee
Wong Chi-ming as cop
Leung Kam-san as cop
Yee Tin-hung as cop in shower room
Chiu Chun-chiu as cop
Wong Lik as cop
Lee Fat-yuen as cop in flashback
Tse Wai-kit as teenage shoplifter
Lam Kai-wing as killer with female partner
Chow Wing
Leung Wai-hung
Robert Mak
Alan Chan
Tang Mei-mei
Lin Li-na
Chau Hou-yin
Kwok Siu-kei
John Ching
Wong Chi-wai
Jackson Ng
Wan Seung-lam
Lam Foo-wai
Jim James as gweilo at the bar

Box office
The film grossed HK$13,230,754 at the Hong Kong box office during its theatrical run from 21 December 1988 to 27 January 1989 in Hong Kong.

Theme song
Melting You and Me (熱溶你與我)
Composer: Michael Lai
Lyricist: Wong Jim
Singer: Anita Mui

See also
Chow Yun-fat filmography

References

External links

City War at Hong Kong Cinemagic

City War film review at LoveHKFilm.com

1988 films
1980s action thriller films
1980s crime thriller films
Hong Kong action thriller films
Hong Kong crime thriller films
Gun fu films
Police detective films
1980s Cantonese-language films
Films set in Hong Kong
Films shot in Hong Kong
1980s Hong Kong films